The BBC Recordings is a live album by English post-punk band the Sound, consisting of two sessions and two live recordings from 1980 to 1985 done for BBC radio. It was released in 2004 by Renascent.

Background 
The first disc of The BBC Recordings consists of two recorded sessions, the first for Mike Read, which was originally broadcast between 6 and 9 October 1980, and the second for John Peel, broadcast on 16 November 1981. The second disc consists of concert recordings, the first broadcast on 21 November 1981 and the second broadcast on 15 June 1985.

Reception 

The BBC Recordings received a positive response from critics. Peter Parrish of Stylus wrote: "Capable of oppressive gloom and fiery beauty in equal measure, this double-CD compilation captures the band at their intense best". AllMusic's Andy Kellman called the Mike Read session "thrilling to hear two decades after the fact, and must've been a revelation in 1980".

Track listing

Personnel 
 The Sound

 Adrian Borland – vocals, guitar
 Graham Bailey – bass guitar
 Colvin "Max" Mayers – keyboard (tracks 1.5–2.15)
 Bi Marshall – keyboard (tracks 1.1–1.4)
 Mike Dudley – drums, sleeve notes

 Additional personnel

 Ian Nelson – saxophone (tracks 2.10, 2.11 and 2.14)

 Technical

 Dale Griffin – production (tracks 1.1–1.4)
 Tony Wilson – production (tracks 1.5–1.8)
 Anthony Pugh – engineering (tracks 1.1–1.8)
 Mark Farrah – engineering (tracks 1.1–1.4)
 Nick Halliwell – mastering
 Andy Chambers – sleeve design
 Nick Griffiths – sleeve photography
 Paul Connolly – liner notes

References

External links 

 

2004 albums
2004 live albums
The Sound (band) albums